Berkay Onarıcı  (born 10 July 1987, in Eskişehir) is a Turkish professional footballer who last played as an attacking midfielder for Mihalgazispor.

Onarıcı played in nine matches for Eskişehirspor in the TFF First League during the 2007–08 season.

References

1987 births
Living people
Turkish footballers
Eskişehirspor footballers
Göztepe S.K. footballers
Sportspeople from Eskişehir

Association football midfielders